Events that have occurred or will occur in 2016 in South Africa. The incumbent President of South Africa is Jacob Zuma who was first elected in 2009 and was re-elected in 2014. Politically, South Africa has held municipal elections in 2016. The political party with the majority in most municipalities in South Africa is the African National Congress, however, the Democratic Alliance managed to gain the key metros of Johannesburg, Pretoria and Port Elizabeth. In international sport, a South African team of 68 athletes competed at the 2016 Summer Olympics. South Africa hosted the African football tournament, 2016 Africa Futsal Cup of Nations in April.

Incumbents
President – Jacob Zuma 
Deputy President – Cyril Ramaphosa
Chief Justice – Mogoeng Mogoeng

Cabinet 
The Cabinet, together with the President and the Deputy President, forms part of the Executive.

National Assembly

Provincial Premiers 
 Eastern Cape Province:         Phumulo Masualle 
 Free State Province:              Ace Magashule 
 Gauteng Province:                 David Makhura
 KwaZulu-Natal Province:       Senzo Mchunu (until 24 May), Willies Mchunu (since 24 May)
 Limpopo Province:                Stanley Mathabatha
 Mpumalanga Province:         David Mabuza
 North West Province:            Supra Mahumapelo
 Northern Cape Province:       Sylvia Lucas
 Western Cape Province:       Helen Zille

Events

February
February 1-April 4 - 2016 Varsity Shield - Rugby
February 8-April 11 - 2016 Varsity Cup - Rugby
February 26-July 16 - 2016 Super Rugby season

April
April 9-July 23 - 2016 Currie Cup qualification - Rugby
April 15–24 - 2016 Africa Futsal Cup of Nations - Football

May
May 18 - South African municipal elections, 2016

June
 June 20–23 - The Tswane riots in which five people die occur in Pretoria and across the metropolitan area.

August
August–October - 2016 Currie Cup First Division - Rugby
August–October - 2016 Currie Cup Premier Division - Rugby
August 5–21 - 68 athletes from South Africa will compete at the 2016 Summer Olympics in Rio de Janeiro, Brazil
August 27-October 8 - 2016 Rugby Championship

September
September 10-October 29 - 2016 Gold Cup - Rugby

Death

August 
 15 – Makhenkesi Stofile, 71, South African politician and diplomat, Premier of the Eastern Cape (1997–2004), Minister of Sport and Recreation (2004–2010), Ambassador to Germany (since 2011).

December 
 5 – Sfiso Ncwane, 37, South African singer.

See also
2016 in South African television

References

 
2010s in South Africa
Years of the 21st century in South Africa